The Arkansas Midland Railroad  is a Class III short-line railroad headquartered in Malvern, Arkansas.

AKMD operates  of line in Arkansas consisting of seven disconnected branch lines and two sister railroads, the Prescott & Northwestern (PNW) and the Warren & Saline River (WSR).  The AKMD branches were formerly part of the Union Pacific Railroad, or a predecessor, while the PNW and WSR lines were acquired from Potlatch Corporation.  All branch lines connect (interchange traffic) with Union Pacific Railroad.  AKMD also interchanges with BNSF in North Little Rock, and the North Louisiana and Arkansas Railroad at McGehee.  

Hot Springs Branch:  from Malvern, through Hot Springs, to Mountain Pine 
North Little Rock Branch:  from North Little Rock to Galloway (7.8 mi. former Cotton Belt, . former Rock Island)
Warren Branch:  from Warren to Dermott, with trackage rights over an additional  to McGehee
Cypress Bend Branch:  from McGehee to Cypress Bend
Helena Branch:  from Lexa to Helena
Jacksonville Branch:  
Prescott and Northwestern Railroad (PNW, affiliated): 
Warren and Saline River Railroad (WSR, affiliated):  
Gurdon Branch (emergency operation of a segment of the Caddo Valley Railroad): 

AKMD traffic generally consists of forest and agricultural products, aggregates, aluminum, building materials and chemicals.

AKMD was a subsidiary of Pinsly Railroad Company, a holding company owning seven short-line railroads in the United States.  The Hot Springs, Helena and Galloway branches are owned by AKMD (purchased in 1992); the Warren, Cypress Bend and Jacksonville branches are leased; the PNW and WSR are owned by Pinsly and operated by AKMD.

On December 5, 2014, Genesee & Wyoming filed a Notice of Exemption with the Surface Transportation Board to acquire AKMD (along with affiliates PNW and WSR) from Pinsly.  The acquisition was complete by 2015.

References

External links
 Arkansas Midland Railway Company, Inc. AKMD #77 Union Pacific Railroad
  Arkansas Midland Railroad (Genesee & Wyoming website)

Arkansas railroads
Spin-offs of the Union Pacific Railroad
Railway companies established in 1992